Elden Pueblo (Hopi: Pasiwvi) was a prehistoric Native American village located at the foot of Mount Elden near Flagstaff, Arizona. The pueblo is thought to have been part of a major trading system. Various trade items such as macaw skeletons from Mexico as well as shell jewelry from the coast of California have been found throughout the site. The area is now protected and is used for research and educational purposes.

History
The area was settled by the Sinagua peoples from approximately 1070 to 1275. It is believed that the site was home to 200–300 people within 60–70 rooms. Aside from the structures constructed of compacted stones, a burial mound was discovered near the site. Two individual burials were found under the site.

The site was discovered by Harold Colton, who originally named it Sheep Hill Pueblo. When Jesse Walter Fewkes excavated it in 1926 and shipped the recovered skeletons and pots to the Smithsonian, it created a controversy with Arizona's archeologists including Colton and Byron Cummings of the University of Arizona. Colton and Fewkes sparred in the journal Science and in various outraged Arizona newspapers. The controversy was part of the impetus for the 1927 Arizona Antiquities Act and the creation of the Northern Arizona Society of Science and Art.

There is some controversy about the burial mound; some say the mound is simply a dirt pile from the nearby Fewkes' excavation. Ruins from another structure were also found underneath the mound which also leads to questions about its authenticity.

Archeological studies have uncovered information regarding architectural design and the social hierarchy of the Sinagua people. Social hierarchy can be deduced from the variations in burial techniques as well as the decorative features of the grave.

Although it has been stated that the Winona meteorite was found at Elden Pueblo, it was in fact found at another Sinagua site miles away.

References

External links

 Interactive Dig, Elden Pueblo at Archaeology (magazine)
 

Native American history of Arizona
Archaeological sites in Arizona
History of Coconino County, Arizona
Coconino National Forest
Archaeological sites on the National Register of Historic Places in Arizona
National Register of Historic Places in Coconino County, Arizona
Protected areas of Coconino County, Arizona
Ruins in the United States
Sinagua
Ancient Puebloan archaeological sites in Arizona